is a Japanese actor, model, and former singer. He is affiliated with Stardust Promotion. He is best known for playing the role of the pink-haired Yuri Kyohei in the 2019 romantic comedy drama Hajimete Koi wo Shita Hi ni Yomu Hanashi as well as Hikari Nonomura (ToQ 4gou) in the 2014 Super Sentai TV series Ressha Sentai ToQger.

Career
When he was a sixth grader, Yokohama was discovered by a talent scout while with his family on his first trip to the trendy Tokyo neighborhood of Harajuku. He is currently working under Stardust Promotion. He was a former member of the male talent group Ebidan, a group also produced by Stardust Promotion.

Yokohama's special skill is Kyokushin karate. In 2011, he won as the champion in the 7th International Youth Karate Tournament for boys aged 13-14 under the 55kg division (World's Best). 

Yokohama's first appearance was at a commercial for Eiko Seminar. He served as a male model of the fashion magazine Nikopuchi through a public audition. Yokohama was voted as number 1 in Menmo. In the same year, he debuted in Kamen Rider Fourze. In 2013, Yokohama made regular appearances in the drama Real Onigokko The Origin.

In February 2014, he appeared in Ressha Sentai ToQger as Hikari/ToQ 4gou.

In March 2015, Yokohama graduated from men's model of Nicola.

Personal life 
Yokohama has a very close relationship with his mother, who happens to do the egosurfing for him. He also has deep admiration for his father, who humbly works as a carpenter. And being the eldest, he is very protective of his younger brother named Kaito, who is just a year younger than him.

Yokohama's hobbies include staring at the wall and listening to music. His favorite artist is amazarashi.

Filmography

Films

TV series

Stage play

Awards

References

External links
 Official profile at Stardust Promotion 
 Official profile at Nicola 
 

21st-century Japanese male actors
Japanese male film actors
Japanese male models
Japanese male television actors
1996 births
Living people
Male actors from Yokohama
Male actors from Kanagawa Prefecture
Stardust Promotion artists